Cairo riot may refer to
Racial unrest in Cairo, Illinois
1977 Egyptian bread riots
1986 Egyptian conscripts riot
2011 Egyptian protests
2012–13 Egyptian protests
June 2013 Egyptian protests